Ville-Langy is a commune in the Nièvre department in central France.

Demographics

It was once vastly populated but due to some political and economic affairs, the population has decreased numerously. Many of the aspiring workers have relocated to Île-de-France (the region in which Paris is found), due to the larger industry and more opportunities (career wise). As a consequence to the sudden lapse in inhabitants, the local school was forced to shut down. The beautiful church is also only available for weddings and services.

See also
Communes of the Nièvre department

References

Communes of Nièvre